The Peugeot VLV was an electric microcar made by Peugeot in 1942. VLV stood for Voiture Légère de Ville (Light City Car).  The car's announcement, on 1 May 1941, triggered some surprise, since Peugeot was the only one of France's large automakers to show interest in electric propulsion at this time.

The car had two wheels at the front and two at the back. The rear track, however, was very narrow, thus dispensing with the need for a differential for the driving wheels.

The VLV was built during the war as a way to side-step fuel restrictions imposed on non-military users by the occupying German forces. Yet, it was banned after only 377 examples were built.

References

Microcars
Electric vehicles introduced in the 20th century

Cars introduced in 1941
1941 in France
Peugeot vehicles